William Kessler may refer to:

 Billy Kessler, a GI Joe character
 William Kessler (handballer) (born 1962), American former handball player
 William Henry Kessler (1924–2002), American architect

See also
 William F. Kessler House, a historic house in Newton, Massachusetts